The Ford Escape is a compact crossover SUV sold by Ford since 2000 over four generations. The first generation was jointly developed with Mazda which also created the Mazda Tribute and Mercury Mariner as the twin model. Second generations of the Ford Escape, Mercury Mariner, and Mazda Tribute were released in 2007 for the 2008 model year, but mostly restricted to North America. In other markets, the first generation models were either replaced by updated first generation versions, or replaced by the Mazda CX-7 (2006) and Ford Kuga (2008). Unlike the collaborative approach taken with the previous model, this time the design and engineering was carried out solely by Ford. Since 2013, the model has been paralleled with the Kuga sold outside North America, making them essentially identical. A hybrid option was again available.

Ford released the third generation model in 2012 for the 2013 model year. For the third-generation, Ford unified the model with the Europe-designed Ford Kuga as per the "One Ford" plan of having only one vehicle per segment internationally. It continues to the fourth-generation in which the North American Escape is identical to the Kuga with a minor cosmetic redesign. Hybrid and plug-in hybrid options are available for the fourth-generation model.



First generation (2001) 

The first generation of Ford Escape was released in 2000 for the 2001 model year. It was jointly developed with Mazda, in which Ford owned a controlling interest, and was released simultaneously with the Mazda Tribute. Although the Escape and Tribute shared the same underpinnings constructed from the Ford CD2 platform (based on Mazda GF underpinnings), the only panels common to the two vehicles were the roof and floor pressings. Powertrains were supplied by Mazda with respect to the base inline-four engine, with Ford providing the optional V6. At first, the twinned models were assembled by Ford in the US for North American consumption, with Mazda in Japan supplying cars for other markets. This followed a long history of Mazda-derived Fords, starting with the Ford Courier in the 1970s.

At the time, larger sport-utility vehicles tended to use pickup truck-based, body-on-frame designs. Other car makers, Jeep, Toyota and Honda had been offering smaller unibody designs, the Jeep Cherokee (XJ), RAV4 and CR-V respectively. Solid rear axles were commonly used on the full-sized truck-based SUVs and Jeep Cherokee due to their ability to carry heavy loads at the expense of a comfortable ride and good handling. Ford and Mazda decided to offer a car-like, unibody design with a fully independent suspension and rack and pinion steering similar to the RAV4 and CR-V in the Escape. Although not meant for serious off-roading, a full-time all-wheel-drive (AWD) system supplied by Dana was optional, which included a locking center differential activated by a switch on the dashboard. The AWD system normally sends most of the power from the engine to the front wheels. If slipping is detected at the front, more power will be sent to the rear wheels in a fraction of a second. The four wheel drive system was a newer version of Ford's "Control Trac" 4x4 system, dubbed the Control Trac II 4WD in the Escape. This system allowed the front wheels to receive 100% of the torque until a slip was detected. Using a Rotary Blade Coupling, the rear wheels could be sent up to 100% of the power in fractions of a second. When switching the system from "Auto" to "On," the front and rear axles are locked at a 50/50 split; the reaction time necessary to engage the rear wheels is reduced via an integrated bypass clutch. The Control Trac II system allows for a four-wheel drive vehicle without the use of a center differential. The entire braking system was built by Continental Teves, including the ABS and various related suspension components.

Ford also sold the first generation Escape in Europe and China as the Ford Maverick, replacing the previous Nissan-sourced model. Then in 2004, for the 2005 model year, Ford's Mercury division released a rebadged version called the Mercury Mariner, sold mainly in North America. The first iteration Escape remains notable as the first SUV to offer a hybrid drivetrain option, released in 2004 for the 2005 model year to North American markets only. CKD production began in 2002 at Ford Lio Ho Motor Co. in Taiwan for various Asian markets. One difference between the Tribute and the Ford Escape is that, in an effort to culture a sporty image, the Tribute's suspension is tuned for a firmer ride than the Escape.

Mainstream production of the first generation Escape/Tribute ended in late 2006. For Asia-Pacific markets, both received respective facelifts in 2006 and had production fully transferred to Ford Lio Ho in Taiwan. Extended production of the Mazda lasted until 2010, and until 2012 for Ford.

Ford Escape

2000–2004 (BA, ZA) 
In North America, it slotted below the larger, truck-based Explorer in Ford's lineup, but was marginally larger than the small SUV offerings from Honda and Toyota. Although it is technically a crossover vehicle, it is marketed by Ford as part of its traditional SUV lineup (Escape, Explorer, Expedition) rather than its separate crossover lineup (Edge, Flex) due to its more conventional SUV styling.

From 2001 to 2004, the Ford Escape was sold in Europe under the Maverick name, and replaced a rebadged version of the Nissan Mistral/Terrano II. Only two versions were made, the 2.0 L Zetec inline-4 engine with manual transmission and 3.0 L Duratec V6 with automatic transmission, both using gasoline as fuel. The absence of a diesel version did not help sales and the vehicle was temporarily discontinued in late 2003. However, the Maverick, in the UK for example, was only available in XLT trim. Plus, the dashboard was not the same as the US Escape; it was instead taken from the Mazda Tribute. The Maverick was reintroduced in 2005 in certain European markets with the Duratec V6 engine. The Maverick was assembled in Russia for the Russian market. As of 2006, the Maverick was no longer sold in Europe, leaving Ford without a compact SUV until the 2008 Ford Kuga was introduced. The Maverick was primarily designed for on-road use – sold with normal road tires, and to be used with front-wheel drive most of the time.

In the Philippines, Ford introduced the Escape in 2001. It originally came in two grades; "XLT" & "XLS", but by early 2004, Ford axed the "XLT" (all-wheel drive model) and replaced it with the newly introduced "V6" trim. The "XLS" is powered by Ford's 2.3L Duratec inline-four engine paired to a 4-speed automatic. It came with keyless entry, fabric upholstery, 4 speakers, 6 CD audio system, among other features. The "V6" is powered by Ford's 3.0L V6 engine paired to a 4-speed automatic. It featured a power moon roof, leather upholstery, automatic seat adjusters & recliners, keyless entry & immobilizer.

Safety 
Crash-test results for the Escape have been mixed. In the New Car Assessment Program administered by the USA-based National Highway Traffic Safety Administration, the car received five out of five stars for driver protection and four out of five stars for passenger protection in a  frontal impact. The SUV received five stars for both driver and rear passenger in the side impact test. In the Insurance Institute for Highway Safety's  frontal offset test, 2001–2004 Escapes received a score of "Marginal".

All Escapes are equipped with a passive 'Immobiliser' called SecuriLock. This feature includes an 'RFID' chip embedded in the key, which the car reads each time the driver inserts the key. If the key doesn't provide a valid confirmation signal, the vehicle does not run, even if the key is perfectly cut to match the original. Theft, injury, and collision losses reported to insurance companies for the Escape are among the lowest in its class.

North America 
In the United States, all Escapes included standard equipment such as power windows with an automatic driver's side window, power door locks, anti-lock braking system (ABS), keyless entry, a folding rear-bench seat, 16-inch wheels, and air conditioning. In addition, an Escape buyer could choose from one of several different trim levels that were available, which included:

XLS (2001–2007): As the most basic trim level of the Escape, the XLS included: the 2.0-liter Zetec (2001–2004) and the 2.3-liter DuraTec (2005–2007) engines, a five-speed manual transmission, 15-inch steel wheels, an AM/FM stereo with cassette and CD players (later, just a single-CD player in 2005, adding MP3 capability in 2007 along with SIRIUS) and four speakers, high-back front bucket seats, and cloth-and-vinyl seating surfaces. Options include 15- or 16-inch alloy wheels, the 3.0-liter V6 engine (2001–2004), and a four-speed automatic transmission (some of which was available as the XLS Popular Group).

XLT (2001–2007): As the top-of-the-line trim level of the Escape in 2001, and the most popular trim level of the Escape throughout its entire run (2001–2007), the XLT added the following equipment to the base XLS trim level: 16-inch alloy wheels, security alarm, cloth seating surfaces, and an enhanced interior. Options included an AM/FM stereo with a six-disc, in-dash CD changer (which later became standard equipment on all Escapes), the 3.0-liter V6 engine, a four-speed automatic transmission, a power sunroof, leather-and-vinyl-trimmed seating surfaces, and the seven-speaker premium audio system with amplifier and rear-mounted subwoofer.

XLT Sport (2002–2007): The XLT Sport was one of the more popular trim levels of the Escape from 2002 to 2007. It added equipment to the standard XLT equipment: the V6 engine, four-speed automatic transmission, sport interior trim, and 16-inch machined alloy wheels. Options were the same as the standard XLT trim level.

Limited (2002–2007): As the top-of-the-line trim level of the Escape from 2002 to 2007, the Limited trim level added the following equipment to the XLT Sport trim level: an AM/FM stereo with six-disc in-dash CD/MP3 changer, the seven-speaker premium audio system with amplifier and rear-mounted subwoofer, low-back front bucket seats, leather-trimmed seating surfaces, dual power heated front bucket seats, a security system, color-keyed exterior trim, luxury interior trim, and a unique front grille. Options were limited, but included a power sunroof.

Hybrid (2005–2007): Based on the midrange XLT trim level, the Hybrid included: the 2.3-liter DuraTec inline-four engine with an electric motor, power front bucket seats, low-back front bucket seats, enhanced partially-recycled cloth seating surfaces, and unique 16-inch alloy wheels. Options included a powered sunroof, a unique integrated GPS navigational system with hybrid information system, Sirius Satellite Radio, the seven-speaker premium audio system with amplifier and rear-mounted subwoofer, leather-trimmed seating surfaces, and a "two-tone" exterior paint scheme, with silver-painted lower exterior trim and front and rear bumpers.

2004–2006 (ZB) 

The Escape and Tribute were updated in February 2004 for the 2005 model year with a new base engine (the 2.3 L  Duratec 23), which replaced the Zetec 2.0 L   4-cylinder. The most powerful engine remained the  Duratec 3.0 L  V6, with new engine mounts. Ford also added advanced airbag and seatbelt safety systems, an intelligent AWD system, and exterior minor changes, which included a redesigned front bumper. The 2005 model year was the first with an automatic transmission available on the base four-cylinder models. The automatic shifter was moved from the column to the console on all models equipped with automatic transmissions. Ford also deleted the recline feature on the rear seats to improve the safety of occupants in the rear seats in the case of a rear crash.

2006–2008 (ZC; Asia-Pacific) 

Previewed by the Ford Equator Concept in 2005, a revamped ZC Escape designed in Taiwan by Ford Lio Ho went on sale in the second half of 2006 for the Asian and Pacific markets (except South Korea, where the North American-market Escape is sold). Major external changes included a redesigned front bumper, grille, headlights and hood, and rear bumper, as well as LED taillights.

On the inside, changes included a floor-mounted automatic-transmission shifter, in place of the column shifter, as well as a redesigned center stack containing audio and climate controls. Climate control is automatic on all models except the XLS. The Limited model also featured full color-coded bumpers, wheel arches and side moldings, as well as side mirrors with integrated LED indicators. Rear drum brakes have been replaced by disc brakes all round.

Both engines had been certified to meet Euro III emission regulations. A four-speed automatic carried over and was the sole transmission choice. Two different four-speed automatic transmissions were used, CD4E for 3.0 L V6 and GF4AX-EL for 2.3 L 4-cylinder.

2008–2009 (ZD; Asia-Pacific) 

Previewed by the Ford Escape Adventure Concept, the ZD Escape designed in Taiwan by Ford Lio Ho for Asia-Pacific markets went on sale in mid-2008, bringing numerous changes. In Australia, the V6 engine was dropped, leaving only the 2.3-liter four-cylinder.

The model range was also simplified, with only a single specification available. Changes to the body included an all-new front bumper, grille, headlights and bonnet, featuring an enlarged Ford emblem set upon a three-bar chrome grille. At the rear, new, slimmer tail lights were featured, which were arranged horizontally, rather than vertically. In addition, the B-pillar was now painted black, rather than body-colour. Compared with the previous model, all external bumpers, mirrors, and cladding were painted the same colour as the body (previously, this was only available on the upscale Limited model). Equipment levels have also improved. Compared to the base model ZC Escape, the ZD included standard side airbags, automatic climate control, 16" alloy wheels, and mirrors with integrated indicators. Unlike most other competitors in its class, curtain airbags and electronic stability control were not available.

2009–2012 (ZD; Asia-Pacific) 

In 2009, another facelift of the ZD Escape developed by Ford Lio Ho brought about a new grille and front bumper. Chrome trim was completely removed from the grille, replaced with a smaller, black honeycomb grille as the last Ford Escape. In its final years, it was sold side by side with its successor, Ford Kuga until the Kuga replaced it in 2013.

Mercury Mariner 

Introduced in 2004 for the 2005-model-year refresh of the Ford Escape in the US, Ford's Mercury division released a version called the Mercury Mariner. The Mariner is Mercury's first car-based SUV, and was slotted below the Mercury Mountaineer in its lineup. The Mariner was officially offered in the US, Mexico, Saudi Arabia, Kuwait, and the UAE. The Mariner includes stylistic differences, such as a two-tone interior, turn signal repeaters borrowed from the European-market Ford Maverick (the Escape's name in Europe), monotone cladding, and the Mercury "waterfall" front grille. Unlike its counterparts, Mercury did not offer a manual transmission as part of the powertrain lineup. The Mariner was the first Mercury with a four-cylinder since the Mercury Cougar was dropped in 2002. For 2006, the lineup was expanded with the introduction of the Mariner Hybrid. Sales ended after the 2007 model, replaced by a second generation, again a rebadged Ford Escape.

On September 7, 2006, Ford delivered a special "Presidential Edition" Mercury Mariner Hybrid to former President Bill Clinton. Its custom features include: LED lighting, 120V outlet, rear bucket seats, center console & rear seat fold-out writing desks, personal DVD players for each seat, refrigerator, increased rear seat legroom. There have also been several undisclosed security modifications made to the vehicle.

The Mariner Hybrid powertrain was identical to its sibling, the Ford Escape Hybrid. It was launched to the U.S. market in 2006 and was discontinued in 2010 (in the second generation) when the Mercury car division itself was discontinued by Ford. The Mariner hybrid sold a total of 12,300 units.

Like the Ford Escape Hybrid, the Mariner Hybrid is a "full" hybrid electric system, meaning the system can switch automatically between pure electric power, pure gasoline engine power, or a combination of electric battery and gasoline engine operating together, for maximum performance and efficiency at all speeds and loads. When braking or decelerating, the Mariner's hybrid system uses regenerative braking, where the electric drive motor becomes a generator, converting the vehicle's momentum back to electricity for storage in the batteries. With , the Mariner Hybrid has nearly the same acceleration performance as the conventional  V6 Mariner.

Hybrid 

The Ford Escape Hybrid and Mercury Mariner Hybrid are the gasoline-electric hybrid powered versions that launched in the U.S. in 2004 for the 2005 model year. Assembled in Kansas City, Missouri, it was the first hybrid SUV produced for sale and the first hybrid from an American manufacturer (alongside the Chevrolet Silverado/GMC Sierra Hybrids during the same model year). According to the Environmental Protection Agency, the first-generation Ford Escape Hybrid is 70% more efficient than the regular Escape. While the Mercury Mariner was also offered as a hybrid, the option was not available on the Mazda Tribute.

Escape hybrid versions can be identified by the "Hybrid" badges located on the front driver's and passenger's doors as well as near the right tailgate. In addition, the driver's side window in the cargo area is smaller to accommodate a ventilation slot for the high voltage battery. There was also a "Special Appearance Package" available as an option on the 2005–2007 Hybrid models. This package replaced the traditional lower cladding of the Escape with a silver finish. Standard equipment on the Escape Hybrid includes: an eight-way power adjustable driver's seat, dual-zone automatic air conditioning, cruise control, a six-CD stereo, 16-inch alloy wheels, power door locks with remote keyless entry, and power windows.

Ford built 17,000 Escape Hybrids in the second half of 2004, four times as many as it had originally planned. Starting in 2005 New York City and other cities in the world began using the Ford Escape Hybrid as taxicabs. The Ford Escape Hybrid won the North American Truck of the Year award in 2005.

Drivetrain technology 
The Escape Hybrid uses hybrid technology similar to that used in the Toyota Prius. Ford engineers realized their technology may conflict with patents held by Toyota, which led to a 2004 patent-sharing accord between the companies, licensing Ford's use of some of Toyota's hybrid technology in exchange for Toyota's use of some of Ford's diesel and direct-injection engine technology. Ford maintains that Ford received no technical assistance from Toyota in developing the hybrid powertrain, but that some hybrid engine technologies developed by Ford independently were found to be similar to technologies previously patented by Toyota, so licenses were obtained. Aisin Seiki Co. Ltd., a Japanese automotive components supplier belonging to the Toyota Group, supplies the HD-10 hybrid continuously variable transmission for the Escape Hybrid. While Toyota produces its third-generation Prius transmission in-house, Aisin is the only supplier of hybrid transmissions to other manufacturers. Friction has arisen concerning Aisin's allocation of limited production capacity and engineering resources to Ford.

The Escape Hybrid is a full hybrid, meaning the system can switch automatically between pure electric power, pure gasoline engine power, or a combination of electric battery and gasoline engine operating together, for maximum performance and efficiency at all speeds and loads. When braking or decelerating, the Escape's hybrid system uses regenerative braking, where the electric drive motor becomes a generator, converting the vehicle's momentum back to electricity for storage in the batteries. The Escape Hybrid's 133 horsepower (99 kW) Atkinson cycle gasoline I4 engine and electric motor combine to give , which gives the Hybrid Escape nearly the same acceleration performance as the conventional  V6 Escape due to the electric motor's torque being available from zero rpm.

The hybrid is said to give approximately 75% greater efficiency, the FWD version has EPA ratings of 30 mpg and 28 highway, with combined 29 mpg. The AWD version EPA ratings 28 city and 26 highway, combined 27 mpg -U.S. in city traffic, and has demonstrated it can travel 400–500 miles (644–805 km) on a single  mpg-U.S. (7.6L-8.1 L/100 km; 35–37 mpg-imp) on the highway. To obtain these mileage figures, the owners manual states that pure gasoline, not ethanol blends, must be used. In 2006, Ford showed an Escape that could run on E85 fuel.

Unlike conventional vehicles, hybrids often achieve better figures in the city because they do not waste power idling and can recover some power when stopping (by using regenerative braking) that would be wasted in a conventional vehicle.

Recalls

Subframe failure 
In April 2014, Ford issued a recall on 386,000 Ford Escapes and Mazda Tributes for model years 2001–2004 for Escapes manufactured October 22, 1999, through January 23, 2004, for Canada and the northern "salt belt" states in the US. Subframe rust can result in the lower control arm mount breaking or detaching from the subframe, resulting in a loss of steering control and the risk of crash. Dealers have installed a crossbrace reinforcement to any vehicle affected by the recall. Model years 2005–2007 were not affected.

Second generation (2008) 

The second generation Ford Escape debuted at the 2006 Los Angeles International Auto Show. The North American-market Escape and its Mazda Tribute and Mercury Mariner siblings were redesigned to stay competitive with other new compact SUVs, however most of the internals have been carried over for the 2008 model year. The Escape still uses the CD2 platform. Ford also included an electronic stability control system standard on the 2008 Escape. The Mercury version lasted until late 2010, withdrawn from the market as part of the closure of the Mercury brand, with Mazda's Tribute ending production in late 2011. Ford ended manufacture of the second series Escape in 2012.

The updated Escape received some styling cues from the Explorer, Edge, and Expedition. Changes include a new grille with larger headlamps in the front fascia, while the sides were revised with cleaner lines and rounder wheel arches. The interior is also completely redesigned, including the newest standard Ford family navigation system.

The 2008 Escape and its Mercury Mariner sibling were the first vehicles to feature Ford's pull-drift steering mode, an enhancement made possible by applying software control to the Electric Power Steering (EPS) system.

The 2008 models of all three CD-2 versions retained the previous generation's engines and transmissions. In 2009, all three versions receceived engine and transmission upgrades that increased performance and fuel economy.

Ford ended production on the second generation Escape in 2011 and moved production to its Louisville Assembly Plant in Louisville, Kentucky, where it was succeeded by a new Escape based on its European CUV counterpart, the Ford Kuga.

Ford 
A new concept version for the Asian market, called the Ford Escape Adventure Concept, was revealed at the 2007 Tokyo Motor Show. It features a revised front and rear fascia, incorporating Ford's three-bar grille styling theme and restyled LED tail lamps.

The Duratec 30 also sees a  fuel economy improvement. Another significant change was the switch to Ford's new 6F35 6-speed automatic, which became standard on all V6 equipped models and optional on the I4.

The Hybrid is also upgraded to use the 2.5 L (albeit still using the Atkinson cycle for better fuel economy). Efficiency improved to  city and  highway according to the USEPA. The 2.5 L engine brings the Hybrid's power output up by  when the electric motor is added in.

Other mechanical changes include a new  rear stabilizer bar, revised suspension tuning, upgrades to the 3.0 L V6 that brought power to 240 hp, and a new exhaust system on all Escapes. The braking system for the Hybrid versions has been revised with a vacuum assist unit that reviewers have said give the brakes a consistent feel over the entire travel of the brake pedal. Previous versions of the Hybrid were reported to have a slightly mushy brake feel, primarily due to the fact that for the first part of the brake travel and braking the system is regenerating power instead of engaging the brake pads against the rotors. However, the brakes, when tested, gave the Escape extremely long stops.

This generation also saw the introduction of the optional "sport appearance package", which includes the upgraded 3.0L V6, changed the front grille from chrome to gloss black, added a gloss black appliqué to the front bumper, changed the rocker covers and door handles from unpainted black plastic to body-coloured, added a gloss black rear spoiler, black headlamp housings, black 17" rims, black cloth/leather interior with piano black trim and removes any exterior "V6" badging. This option was only available on the XLT trim level and only with ingot silver, sterling grey, steel blue or tuxedo black metallic paints. The "Escape" badge is entirely removed from the front doors.

In 2009, Ford's SYNC system is standard on the Hybrid, Hybrid Limited, and conventional Limited models, and optional on the XLS and XLT.

The Escape underwent some minor aerodynamic changes for 2009, including a revised front chin spoiler and rear tire spoilers. Along with the addition of rear tire spoilers is an optional 17" chrome-clad wheel equipped with a new Michelin "Low-Rolling-Resistance-Tire", slightly increasing ground clearance and improving traction over the standard 16" wheels and tires. Another new feature is Ford's Easy-Fuel capless fuel filling system.

As of August 2009 the Escape was among the four Ford vehicles, along with the Focus, F-Series and Ranger, to benefit the most from the Cash for Clunkers program, where it showed a 49 percent increase in sales.

In 2009 for the 2010 model year, the Escape will add three new features that will be standard on all trims: Ford's MyKey, trailer sway controls and Integrated Spotter Mirror for better blind spot viewing. Everything else added in the 2008 and 2009 model years will be carried over, but the optional orders have been renamed to Rapid Specification Codes (100s for XLS, 200s for XLT, and 300s for Limited).

New optional features for 2010: active park assist (APA) is a new feature available since mid-2009 as an option on the 2010 Ford Escape Limited (currently only optional on the Ford Flex, Lincoln MKT, and Lincoln MKS). Active Park Assist will detect an available parallel parking space and automatically steer the vehicle into the space (hands free) while the driver controls the accelerator, gearshift and brakes. The system will visually and audibly instruct the driver to park the vehicle. Active Park Assist system uses sensors on the front and rear of the vehicle to guide the vehicle into a parking space. Rear-view camera system – uses an exterior camera embedded in the rear of the vehicle that sends images to a video display in the rearview mirror or the navigation system screen to help enhance visibility directly behind the vehicle when it is in reverse.

No cosmetic changes were made for the 2011 model year. The only minor change is the standardization of SYNC Traffic & Directions on any models coming equipped with Sync.

There are no cosmetic or equipment changes for the 2012 model year. The third-generation Escape was unveiled at the 2012 North American International Auto Show in Detroit.

Previously unavailable Electronic Stability Control system became standard on the second generation. In Insurance Institute for Highway Safety crash tests the Escape along with its cousins, the Mercury Mariner and the Mazda Tribute, are rated "Good" in both frontal and side impact crash tests. They are rated "Good" for rear crash protection as well and were given the "Top Safety Pick" award until 2010. In roof strength tests the Escape receives a "Marginal" rating while hybrid models are rated "Poor".

Mazda 

In 2007 for the 2008 model year, the Tribute was significantly revamped, like its Ford Escape and Mercury Mariner siblings. Originally set to be renamed the Mazda CX-5, the vehicle kept the Tribute name. The changes were significant, but fell short of a "clean sheet" redesign, as the vehicles remained on the CD2 platform, and kept the old 2.3 L MZR I4, and 3.0 L AJ V6 engines. Visible changes include all new sheet metal and interior. The interior was significantly upgraded using all new components and higher quality materials, and was generally praised by automotive journalists. However, unlike the first generation of the Tribute, which had unique exterior and interior from its siblings, the new model only differs from its siblings in the "nose" (front fenders, hood, and front fascia), tail lights and detailing. Notable changes to the exterior include higher belt line, and more pronounced wheel arches. Overall the car was to look larger and more substantial than the previous model. As a cost-saving measure, the rear brake was reverted to drum brake, with predictable criticisms.

The 2008 Mazda Tribute (non-hybrid) was first unveiled at the 2007 Montreal International Auto Show, and the 2008 Mazda Tribute went on sale in March 2007. A new addition was the Hybrid model, which was previously only available on the Ford Escape and Mercury Mariner.

The Tribute received additional major changes to improve performance for the 2009 model year, mostly by way of mechanical upgrades. Most significantly, all new engines replaced the increasingly outmatched 2.3L I4 and 3.0L V6. It also sees a 1 mpg improvement. The Tribute Hybrid was dropped after the 2009 model year.

Another significant change was the switch to Ford's new 6F 6-speed automatic, which became standard on all V6 equipped models and optional on the I4. As well, new front and  rear stabilizer bars were added for 2009 to improve ride handling after complaints about diminished performance following the 2008 changes. Others changes included redesigned seats, daytime running lamps, optional steering mounted audio controls, and other additional features. The Tribute was discontinued in November 2011 at the end of the 2011 model year, replaced by the Mazda CX-5 for 2012.

Mercury 

For the 2008 model year the Mariner was significantly updated with a new look although it remained on the Ford CD2 platform used by the previous generation. The first 2008 Mercury Mariner was unveiled at the South Florida International Auto Show on October 6, 2006. The changes included a new seats, headlights, taillights, a new liftgate, a higher beltline and new doors and wheels. The interior was also significantly updated with higher quality materials and more refined features. The engines remained the same but the 3.0 L Duratec V6 has been modified to reduce fuel consumption by 10%.

The 2009 Ford Escape and Mercury Mariner were unveiled at the 2008 Washington Auto Show. The new engine was also the new basis for Ford's hybrid models, including the Ford Escape Hybrid and Mercury Mariner Hybrid. "For every eight Escape and Mariner vehicles we sell, one of them is a hybrid, and the appeal is growing," says Sue Cischke, Ford senior vice president, Sustainability, Environment and Safety Engineering.

For the 2010 model year, the Mariner added Ford's MyKey and trailer sway controls as standard on all trim levels. The Mariner engine has a Flex-Fuel option on all models—meaning they can use E85 fuel or regular unleaded only on the optional V6 engine. Ford has also done away with the Euro-style turn signal repeaters for this model year. For the 2011 model year, the Mariner featured HD Radio as a standard, but continued with the same features as the 2010 models. This version of the Mariner was its last, as Ford discontinued the Mercury brand due to declining sales. Ford ended production of the Mariner in October 2010. The last one rolled off the assembly line on October 5, 2010.

Hybrid 

The second generation Ford Escape Hybrid received some minor styling tweaks inside and out. The major cosmetic changes included new bumpers, grille, headlights and taillights to match Ford's new edge style. But the drivetrain was essentially the same mechanically but has had extensive software modifications. For 2009, a larger, more powerful engine was introduced, together with a revised suspension, addition of stability control, the debut of "Sync" voice-control system and a capless fuel filler system. The batteries and other hybrid components in a 2009 Escape hybrid added about 136 kg (300 lbs) to the vehicle. However, the added weight was blamed for an adverse effect in handling. Furthermore, from 2009 onward, rear disc brakes of previous years were swapped for drum brakes, which was criticized as a "strange step backward".

The second generation Escape Hybrid was offered in two levels of specification, an undesignated base model and the more expensive "Limited" trim. The base included: a 60/40 split-fold rear bench seat, AdvanceTrac with roll stability control, and a single-disc four-speaker CD/MP3 stereo with Sirius Satellite Radio compatibility. The "Limited" adds: a chrome front grille, heated front seats, a six-way power driver's seat and full leather upholstery, rear park assist, ambient lighting, and 16-inch six-spoke alloy wheels. For the 2009 model year, Ford SYNC became standard on both Hybrid trims and the Ford Escape Hybrid replaced the "ESCAPE" badges on doors with "HYBRID," while relocating the logo for Ford hybrid models from near the driver's side doors next to the "HYBRID" text. 2010 models saw the addition of MyKey, trailer sway controls, and integrated spotter mirror for better blind spot viewing. New optional extras are active park assist and a rear-view camera.

Ford developed a prototype E85 Hybrid Escape, the first flexible fuel hybrid electric vehicle capable of running on 85% ethanol. In 2007 Ford produced 20 demonstration Escape Hybrid E85s for real-world testing in fleets around the U.S.

From 2009, the gas engine was 2.5L Atkinson-cycle four cylinder engine with 155 hp at 6,000 rpm with an electric motor that produces 94 hp at 5,000 rpm. The maximum combined output of both was 177 hp.

The U.S. Environmental Protection Agency (EPA) rated the fuel economy for the 2010 Escape Hybrid (FWD) at  city, and  highway. The following table compares fuel economy, carbon footprint, and petroleum consumption between the hybrid version and other drivetrains of the Escape family as estimated by the EPA and the U.S. Department of Energy. The Escape Hybrid met both California's SULEV and PZEV standards, with tailpipe emissions better than 90% less than the average 2003 new car and zero evaporative emissions.

By early 2012 Ford discontinued the production of the Escape Hybrid due to the introduction of the third generation Escape. Two of the new 2013 model year Escapes have direct-injected and turbocharged EcoBoost units (of 1.6 and 2.0 liters) that deliver a higher fuel economy than the 2012 model. A total of 122,850 Escape Hybrids were built since 2005, along with 12,300 units of its sibling the Mercury Mariner Hybrid, discontinued in 2010.

Plug-in hybrid 

Three companies have converted Ford Escape Hybrids to plug-in under a contract with the NYSERDA and delivered them in 2007: Electrovaya of Toronto Canada, Hymotion also of Toronto Canada, Hybrids Plus of Boulder Colorado, United States.

Ford developed a research Escape Plug-in Hybrid and delivered the first of a fleet of 20 to Southern California Edison (SCE) in December 2007 to begin road testing. This project was a collaboration aimed to explore the future of plug-in hybrids and evaluate how the vehicles might interact with the home and the utility's electrical grid. Some of the vehicles were evaluated "in typical customer settings", according to Ford. Ford also developed the first ever flexible-fuel plug-in hybrid SUV, which was delivered to the United States Department of Energy in June 2008. This plug-in version of the Escape Hybrid runs on gasoline or E85 and is also part of the demonstration fleet Ford developed in a partnership with Southern California Edison and the Electric Power Research Institute.

When the battery's charge drops to 30%, the vehicle switches to its four-cylinder engine, assisted by the batteries, operating as a regular hybrid electric vehicle. The vehicle has a display system that shows the driver how efficient the vehicle is at any given time.

This fleet of 20 Ford Escape Plug-ins was field tested with utility company fleets in California, New York, Ohio, North Carolina, Alabama, Georgia, Massachusetts, Michigan, and Quebec, Canada, with sales scheduled to being in 2012.

In August 2009 Ford delivered the first Escape Plug-in equipped with intelligent vehicle-to-grid (V2G) communications and control system technology to American Electric Power of Columbus, Ohio. This technology allows the vehicle operator to program when to recharge the vehicle, for how long and at what utility rate. The battery systems communicate directly with the electrical grid via smart meters provided by utility companies through wireless networking.

The Ford demonstration vehicles and Hybrids Plus conversions are similar. The conversion involves the replacement of the original NiMH battery, located on the floor of the trunk, with a larger capacity Li-ion battery, in the same location and substantially the same volume as the original battery. The Electrovaya and Hymotion conversions retain the original battery, and augment its capacity with a Li-ion battery that occupies a significant portion of the trunk. In all cases, the conversion also involves the addition of a charger and of a power plug.

Third generation (2013) 

The third-generation Escape was first shown at the 2011 Los Angeles Auto Show. It was designed and rebadged by Ford of Europe alongside the largely identical European-market Ford Kuga. It was released to North American markets in 2012 for the 2013 model year. Many markets that previously used the "Escape" nameplate have switched to "Kuga" under the One Ford program, apart from the Middle East where it still bears the "Escape" nameplate.

The third-generation Escape is claimed to be 10 percent more aerodynamic than the previous generation. Also new for the 2013 model year is the MyFord Touch entertainment system, which offers an all-new user interface and additional features. Another new feature is the optional hands-free liftgate. A person carrying the keyless entry transmitter can raise a foot under the rear bumper of the Escape to open the tailgate. Ecofriendly seat fabrics are standard on lower trim levels, and the vehicle's carpeting is mostly constructed from recycled plastic water bottles. This allows the new Escape to be mostly recyclable at the end of its lifecycle.

Production of the 2013 Ford Escape began 11 April 2012, with ceremonies in June 2012. The production of the previous generation 2012 Escape ended on 28 April 2012, overlapping slightly in production with the 2013 model due to plant issues, with the 2012 Ford Escape vehicles being limited in availability at Ford showrooms. In May 2012, the third-generation Escape became available at most dealerships across the United States, and was introduced in Canada starting June.

Powertrain 
The basic engine is a 2.5-liter, naturally aspirated inline-four engine. Two EcoBoost inline, four-cylinder, turbocharged engines are offered in North America, which are 1.6-liter and 2.0-liter unit. The 2013 Escape is the first Ford vehicle to offer the 1.6-liter unit. Ford claims that the fuel economy of the new 1.6-liter EcoBoost engine will match that of the previous Ford Escape Hybrid, while the new 2.0-liter engine produces more torque than the current V6 unit. The transmission is a six-speed automatic. Compared to its predecessor, both the hybrid model with its 2.5-liter Atkinson powertrain and the 3.0 L V6 engine have been dropped. The C-Max Hybrid indirectly replaced the Escape Hybrid.

Trim levels 
The third-generation Escape was offered with front-wheel drive in the S trim level, and front- or all-wheel drive in the SE, SEL, and Titanium trim levels. The SEL trim was discontinued after the 2013 model year, but was reintroduced for 2018.

2017 refresh 
On 18 November 2015, Ford unveiled a refreshed mid-cycle update of the Escape, which went on sale in the beginning of 2016 for the 2017 model year. The refresh added an Edge-inspired front fascia, while tweaking the rear end that now sports reshaped LED taillights and a newly adopted two-slat, hexagonal grille. The interior was also adjusted slightly in the cabin area and on the steering wheel.

The Sync 3 infotainment system was added as a new feature, along with a new smartphone app called Sync Connect, which allows owners to remotely monitor their vehicle, check fuel levels, lock and unlock doors, and start the engine. The 2.5 and 2.0 EcoBoost engine line-up was joined by a new  1.5 L, turbocharged, four-cylinder option, replacing the 1.6 L.

Ford engineers promised additional refinement to the 2017 Escape, particularly as evidenced by extremely low road- and wind-noise levels. The doors and B pillars are insulated, the front wheel wells are lined, and acoustic glass is used for the side windows. Also, new seals are used for the windshield and hood. The new Escape showcased a number of new-to-it features, from faster-charging USB ports to an application that lets drivers unlock the vehicle and start the engine through a smartphone.

Dubbed Sync Connect, this feature helps to locate the vehicle in a crowded parking lot, check the fuel level, and alert the owner when service is due. A number of driver-assist features were available: Enhanced park assist, lane-keeping, forward collision warning, and adaptive cruise control. Production of the facelifted 2017 Ford Escape started on 18 March 2016, at the Louisville Assembly Plant in Kentucky.

Safety

Recall 
In March 2017, Ford recalled 692,700 2014 Escapes because of faulty door latches.

Fire hazard 
In December 2012, Ford recalled over 70,000 Escapes in the United States and Canada with 1.6 L engines that may overheat and cause fires, after 12 reports of fires in Escapes were reported to Ford.

In November 2013, Ford recalled over 160,000 Escapes with 1.6 L EcoBoost engines because of oil and fuel leaks that could lead to engine fires, after 13 fires caused by leaks were reported to Ford; the recall also covered about 12,000 to correct fuel lines installed incorrectly that could become chafed and leak gasoline.

In March 2017, Ford recalled 2014 Escapes with 1.6 L EcoBoost engines because of a risk of engine fires caused by a "lack of coolant circulation". The recall partly contributed to a charge of US$300 million by Ford.

Fourth generation (2020) 

The fourth-generation Escape made its official debut on April 2, 2019, and went on sale in the third quarter of 2019 as a 2020 model. It is built at the Louisville Assembly Plant in Louisville, Kentucky. It also serves the third-generation Ford Kuga for countries outside North America.

Compared to its predecessor, the model is claimed to be lighter by over  while occupying a footprint that is larger due to a wider track and longer length. With its larger size, the Escape provides more interior space for occupants by increasing headroom, shoulder space, and hip room for both rows of seats.

In China, the fourth generation Escape has a slightly restyled front fascia compared to the North American version, and would be sold alongside the previous generation, which was sold as the Ford Kuga.

It received a facelift in October 2022.

Markets

United States 
In the United States, the Escape is available in five trim levels: S, SE, SE Sport, SEL, and Titanium. All trims except for the S trim (only available with a gasoline engine) and the SE Sport (only available as a gasoline hybrid model) are available with gasoline-only, gasoline hybrid, and gasoline plug-in hybrid (PHEV) powertrains. Gasoline-only models use an eight-speed automatic transmission, while all other models use a continuously variable transmission (CVT). All models also offer a choice of either front-wheel drive or all-wheel drive, except for PHEV models which are only available with front-wheel drive.

There are four new engine-transmission combinations including a plug-in gas-electric hybrid that can go  on electricity alone with an efficiency rating of 100 MPGe, as well as a conventional hybrid and two turbocharged engines mated to an eight-speed automatic transmission.

It is paired with an eight-speed automatic transmission with front-wheel drive or optional all-wheel drive.

The Escape Hybrid, returning after an extended absence, and all new plug-in hybrid are powered by a 2.5-liter gasoline inline-four that runs on the more efficient Atkinson cycle, along with two electric motors and a planetary gearset that combines the two power sources and allows for gear-ratio changes, essentially operating as a continuously variable automatic transmission. The standard hybrid's battery pack is rated at 1.1 kilowatt-hours, while the plug-in hybrid's is significantly larger, at 14.4 kWh; both are lithium-ion packs that fit under the floor. It has S, SE, SE Sport, SEL, and Titanium trim levels.

The PHEV model became available in U.S. dealers in October 2021 for the 2021 model year.

Mexico 
On October 17, 2019, this generation went on sale in Mexico.

Australia 
The fourth-generation Escape became available in Australia in the third quarter of 2020, designated as the ZH series. While marketed as the Escape, the Australian model adopts the exterior styling from the European Kuga as the vehicles are sourced from Spain. Powertrain options include a 2.0-litre EcoBoost gasoline engine and a 2.5-litre plug-in hybrid. Trim levels offered are standard, ST-Line, and Vignale.

China and Taiwan 
In China, the fourth-generation Escape was sold alongside its predecessor, which was sold as the Kuga in China. The Chinese market version features a restyled front fascia with a larger grille, and the blue oval logo being positioned in the center of the grille. The same styling variant was also sold as the Ford Kuga in the Taiwanese market with the 1.5L engine models. 2.0L engine models were sold with European styling front grille.

Sales

Ford Escape

Mercury Mariner

References

External links 

 

Escape
Compact sport utility vehicles
Crossover sport utility vehicles
Front-wheel-drive vehicles
All-wheel-drive vehicles
Ford CD2 platform
Motor vehicles manufactured in the United States
Hybrid sport utility vehicles
Flexible-fuel vehicles
Partial zero-emissions vehicles
Plug-in hybrid vehicles
Cars introduced in 2000
2010s cars
2020s cars
Vehicles with CVT transmission